The Rivers State Ministry of Commerce and Industry is a government ministry of Rivers State, Nigeria that is charged with the responsibility of dealing with matters that have to do with commerce, industry and cooperative, as well as to accelerate the economic and commercial development of the state. The ministry is led by its Commissioner, Chukwuma Chinye, who is assisted by Permanent Secretary Kadilo Brown. The official headquarters of the ministry are at State Secretariat, Port Harcourt.

See also
List of government ministries of Rivers State
Government of Rivers State

References

Commerce and Industry
Rivers State
Rivers State
Industry ministries